Bromio is the first album by the Italian experimental rock band Zu, released in 1999.

Track list

 Detonatore - 3:36
 Xenitis - 3:12
 Testa di Cane - 3:06
 Paonazzi - 1:20
 Zu Circus - 3:42
 Asmodeo - 4:06
 Cane Maggiore - 3:25
 Epidurale - 1:52
 Villa Belmonte - 2:55
 Erotomane - 4:26
 La Grande Madre Delle Bestie - 5:44

References

1999 albums
Zu (band) albums